United Nations Security Council Resolution 341, adopted on October 27, 1973, after the report of the Secretary-General on the implementation of Resolution 340, the Council decided that the Peacekeeping Force would be established for a six-month period and would be continued thereafter if the Council wished it to do so.

The resolution was adopted with 14 votes to none, with the People's Republic of China not participating in the vote.

See also
 Arab–Israeli conflict
 List of United Nations Security Council Resolutions 301 to 400 (1971–1976)
 Yom Kippur War

References
Text of the Resolution at undocs.org

External links
 

 0341
Arab–Israeli peace process
Yom Kippur War
October 1973 events